Sri Narayana Matriculation Higher Secondary School is a secondary school in Coimbatore, Tamil Nadu, India. It was founded by Mrs. Nandhini Santha Kumaran.

High schools and secondary schools in Tamil Nadu
Schools in Coimbatore